The Rough Guide to World Roots is a world music compilation album originally released in 1999. Part of the World Music Network Rough Guides series, the album gives broad coverage to global folk and roots revival music.

Five of the fourteen tracks come from The Americas (Ecuador, Cuba [2], USA, & Brazil), three from Asia (Uzbekistan, Indonesia, Pakistan), three from Europe (Belgium, Italy, Hungary), and three from Africa (South Africa and Senegal [2]). The compilation was produced by Phil Stanton, co-founder of the World Music Network.

Critical reception

Writing for AllMusic, Heather Phares claimed the album "delivers what its title promises", calling it a "solid grounding" in world roots music.

Track listing

References 

1999 compilation albums
World Music Network Rough Guide albums